Pierre Marcel de Wit (born 26 September 1987) is a German former professional footballer who played as a midfielder.

Early life
Pierre was born in Köln to Lothar and Monika de Wit and grew up in the suburban Chorweiler.

Career
De Wit began his career 1992 with SC Köln Weiler Volkhoven and in 2005, he was scouted by Bayer 04 Leverkusen. After one year in the A-Youth (U-19) of the club, he was promoted to the Regionalliga team, and earned his first professional games. In July 2007 he was called for the Bundesliga team of Leverkusen. He gave his debut on 8 November 2006 in 3–1 win over VfL Bochum. After the season, de Wit left Leverkusen and joined VfL Osnabrück on loan. He played for VfL Osnabrück for two years, earning 47 caps, and scoring five goals. On 30 June 2009, he returned to Leverkusen. After his return he only played for Leverkusen's reserve team.

On 3 December 2009, de Wit announced his signing with 1. FC Kaiserslautern.

On 5 August 2013, he joined MSV Duisburg on a three-year contract until June 2016.

Personal life
He is married to Turkish-German girl Sevgi Özdamar. The couple has a daughter – Amelie, born in May 2011. Pierre's uncle is the former 2. Bundesliga player Dirk de Wit.

References

External links
 

1987 births
Living people
Footballers from Cologne
Association football midfielders
German footballers
Bayer 04 Leverkusen players
Bayer 04 Leverkusen II players
MSV Duisburg players
VfL Osnabrück players
1. FC Kaiserslautern players
Bundesliga players
2. Bundesliga players
3. Liga players
German people of Dutch descent